Enying is a district in south-western part of Fejér County. Enying is also the name of the town where the district seat is found. The district is located in the Central Transdanubia Statistical Region.

Geography 
Enying District borders with Székesfehérvár District to the north, Sárbogárd District to the east, Tamási District (Tolna County) to the south, Siófok District (Somogy County) and Balatonalmádi District (Veszprém County) to the west. The number of the inhabited places in Enying District is 9.

Municipalities 
The district has 1 town, 2 large villages and 6 villages.
(ordered by population, as of 1 January 2012)

The bolded municipality is city, italics municipalities are large villages.

See also
List of cities and towns in Hungary

References

External links
 Postal codes of the Enying District

Districts in Fejér County